The Women's Giant Slalom World Cup 2021/2022 consisted of 9 events including the final. Overall World Cup leader Mikaela Shiffrin from the United States, who started out in the early lead in this discipline, contracted COVID-19 at the end of 2021 and missed the post-Christmas giant slalom, then Shiffrin lost the lead in this discipline to Sara Hector of Sweden in the first race in 2022. 

As noted above, the season was interrupted by the 2022 Winter Olympics in Beijing, China (at the Yanqing National Alpine Skiing Centre in Yanqing District) from 6–19 February 2022.  Although the Alpine Skiing branch of the International Ski Federation (FIS) conducts the World Cup and co-organizes the Alpine skiing at the Winter Olympics (along with the International Olympic Committee {IOC)), the Winter Olympics are organized by nation (a maximum of four skiers is permitted per nation), and (after 1968) the Olympic results do not count for World Cup points. Accordingly, the results in the Olympics are highlighted in blue and shown in this table by ordinal position only in each discipline. The women's giant slalom was held at the "Ice River" course on 7 February 2022.

Hector continued to hold the lead in the discipline into March, as 2017 discipline champion Tessa Worley of France emerged as her main late-season competition. Going into the final, Hector held only a five point lead over Worley.  Shiffrin held a huge lead of almost a second after the first run and seemed likely to win the title, but she shockingly melted down in the second run, finishing seventh and handing the season title to Worley.

The World Cup final was held on Sunday, 20 March in the linked resorts of Courchevel and Méribel, France, which are located in Les Trois Vallées, on the Roc de Fer course at Méribel. Only the top 25 skiers in the World Cup giant slalom discipline and the winner of the Junior World Championship, plus athletes who have scored at least 500 points in the World Cup overall classification for the season, were eligible to compete in the final, and only the top 15 earned World Cup points.

Standings

Legend

DNQ = Did Not Qualify for run 2
DNF1 = Did Not Finish run 1
DSQ1 = Disqualified run 1
DNF2 = Did Not Finish run 2
DSQ2 = Disqualified run 2
DNS2 = Did Not Start run 2

See also
 2021–22 World Cup – Women's rankings
 2022 Alpine Skiing World Cup – Women's Overall
 2022 Alpine Skiing World Cup – Women's Downhill
 2022 Alpine Skiing World Cup – Women's Super-G
 2022 Alpine Skiing World Cup – Women's Slalom
 2022 Alpine Skiing World Cup – Women's Parallel

References

External links
 Alpine Skiing at FIS website

Women's giant slalom
FIS Alpine Ski World Cup women's giant slalom discipline titles